Milana Dudieva (born August 4, 1989) is a Russian mixed martial artist who formerly competed in the Bantamweight division of the Ultimate Fighting Championship (UFC).

Mixed martial arts career
Dudieva made her debut in 2009 against Julia Berezikova, losing by submission to strikes in the first round. Dudieva won her next eight fights including a win over future UFC Women's Bantamweight Sheila Gaff.

Dudieva would drop next two fights to Jéssica Andrade and Pannie Kianzad.

Ultimate Fighting Championship
After winning her next two fights Dudieva signed a contract with UFC and was expected to make her debut at UFC 174 against Germaine de Randamie. De Randamie pulled out of the fight due to injury and would be replaced by Valerie Letourneau. Dudieva would also get forced off the card due to injury and was replaced by Elizabeth Phillips.

Dudieva would finally make her debut at UFC Fight Night 48, taking on the girl who replaced her in her last fight, Elizabeth Phillips. She won via split decision.

Dudieva's next fight was against the first woman to win The Ultimate Fighter, Julianna Peña. She lost via TKO in round one.

Upon her Twitter page Dudieva announced that she would take some time off due to her becoming pregnant. Dudieva returned after a year away and lost to Marion Reneau after which she was let go from the UFC.

Invicta Fighting Championship
In 2017, Dudieva signed with Invicta FC and made her debut in a headline bout against Mara Romero Borella on July 15, 2017 at Invicta FC 24: Dudieva vs. Borella. She lost the fight via split decision.

Dudieva faced Vanessa Porto at Invicta FC 26: Maia vs. Niedwiedz She lost the fight via technical knock out on round three.

Dudieva faced Christina Marks on March 24, 2018 at Invicta FC 28: Morandin vs. Jandiroba. Dudieva won the fight via second round TKO. In 2019, Dudieva lost a split decision to Karina Rodriguez and then entered the second Phoenix Rising tournament where she lost a decision to Daiana Torquato.

Dudieva was scheduled to face Daiana Torquato at Invicta FC 46 on March 9, 2022. However, after the main even fighter withdrew from the bout four days before the event, Torquato was promoted to the main event tite bout. Dudieva was instead scheduled against Denise Gomes. She lost the bout in the third round due to technical knockout by knees and punches.

Mixed martial arts record

|-
|Loss
| align=center| 12–9
| Denise Gomes
| TKO (knees and punches)
| Invicta FC 46: Rodríguez vs. Torquato II
| 
| align=center|3
| align=center|1:56
| Kansas City, Kansas, United States
|
|-
|Loss
|align=center|12–8
|Karina Rodríguez
|Decision (split)
|Invicta FC 34: Porto vs. Gonzalez
|February 15, 2019
|align=center|3
|align=center|5:00
|Kansas City, Missouri, United States
|
|-
|Win
|align=center|12–7
|Christina Marks
|TKO (punches)
|Invicta FC 28: Mizuki vs. Jandiroba
|March 24, 2018
|align=center|2
|align=center|3:57
|Salt Lake City, Utah, United States
|
|-
|Loss
|align=center|11–7
|Vanessa Porto
|TKO (punch to the body)
|Invicta FC 26: Maia vs. Niedzwiedz
|December 8, 2017
|align=center|3
|align=center|3:02
|Kansas City, Missouri, United States
|
|-
|Loss
|align=center|11–6
|Mara Romero Borella
|Decision (split)
|Invicta FC 24: Dudieva vs. Borella
|July 15, 2017
|align=center|3
|align=center|5:00
|Kansas City, Missouri, United States
|
|-
|Loss
|align=center|11–5
|Marion Reneau
|TKO (punches and elbows)
|UFC Fight Night: Mousasi vs. Hall 2
|November 19, 2016
|align=center|3
|align=center|3:03
|Belfast, Northern Ireland
|
|-
| Loss
|align=center| 11–4
|Julianna Peña
|TKO (punches and elbows)
|UFC Fight Night: Mendes vs. Lamas
|April 4, 2015
|align=center|1
|align=center|3:59
|Fairfax, Virginia, United States
|
|-
| Win
|align=center| 11–3
|Elizabeth Phillips
|Decision (split)
|UFC Fight Night: Bisping vs. Le
|August 23, 2014
|align=center|3
|align=center|5:00
|Macau, SAR, China
|
|-
| Win
|align=center| 10–3
| Danielle West
| Submission (heel hook)
| ProFC 53 - Khachatryan vs. Egorov
|April 6, 2014
|align=center|1
|align=center|3:34
|Rostov-on-Don, Russia
|
|-
| Win
|align=center| 9–3
| Anastasia Plisenkova
| Submission (armbar)
| Oplot Challenge 100
|February 15, 2014
|align=center|1
|align=center|0:32
|Kharkiv, Ukraine
|
|-
| Loss
|align=center| 8–3
| Pannie Kianzad
| Decision (unanimous)
| ProFC 50
|October 16, 2013
|align=center|3
|align=center|5:00
|Rostov-on-Don, Russia
|
|-
| Loss
|align=center| 8–2
| Jéssica Andrade
| Submission (guillotine choke)
| ProFC 47 - Russia vs. Europe
|April 14, 2013
|align=center|2
|align=center|4:34
|Rostov-on-Don, Russia
|
|-
| Win
|align=center| 8–1
| Danielle West
| TKO (punches)
| ProFC 40
|April 1, 2012
|align=center|1
|align=center|0:24
|Volgograd, Russia
|
|-
| Win
|align=center| 7–1
| Risalat Mingbatyrova
| Submission (armbar)
| ProFC - Battle on Don
|August 5, 2011
|align=center|1
|align=center|0:41
|Rostov-on-Don, Russia
|
|-
| Win
|align=center| 6–1
| Sheila Gaff
| Decision (unanimous)
| ProFC 22
|December 17, 2010
|align=center|3
|align=center|5:00
|Rostov-on-Don, Russia
|
|-
| Win
|align=center| 5–1
| Ludmila Delicheban
| TKO (punches)
| ProFC - Commonwealth Cup
|April 23, 2010
|align=center|1
|align=center|1:16
|Moscow, Russia
|
|-
| Win
|align=center| 4–1
| Victoria Syniavina
| TKO (doctor stoppage)
| ProFC - Union Nation Cup 4
|December 19, 2009
|align=center|1
|align=center|0:27
|Rostov-on-Don, Russia
|
|-
| Win
|align=center| 3–1
| Ekaterina Tarnavskaja
| Submission (straight armbar)
| ProFC - Union Nation Cup 1
|August 21, 2009
|align=center|1
|align=center|2:23
|Rostov-on-Don, Russia
|
|-
| Win
|align=center| 2–1
| Zeinab Gaurgashvily
| Submission (bulldog choke)
| ProFC - King of The Night 2
|July 4, 2009
|align=center|1
|align=center|1:45
|Rostov-on-Don, Russia
|
|-
| Win
|align=center| 1–1
| Anna Smirnova
| Submission (straight armbar)
| ProFC - King of The Night
|May 30, 2009
|align=center|1
|align=center|2:49
|Rostov-on-Don, Russia
|
|-
| Loss
|align=center| 0–1
| Julia Berezikova
| Submission (punches)
| FightForce: Day of Anger
|February 28, 2009
|align=center|1
|align=center|4:40
|Saint Petersburg, Russia
|
|-

Mixed martial arts exhibition record

|-
|Loss
|align=center|12–8
|Daiana Torquato
|Decision (split)
|Invicta FC Phoenix Series 2
|September 6, 2019
|align=center|1
|align=center|5:00
|Kansas City, Kansas, United States
|Strawweight tournament quarter-final bout. 
|-

See also
 List of female mixed martial artists

References

External links
 
 
 Milana Dudieva at Invicta FC

1989 births
Living people
Sportspeople from Vladikavkaz
Russian female mixed martial artists
Bantamweight mixed martial artists
Mixed martial artists utilizing judo
Russian female judoka
Ultimate Fighting Championship female fighters